Trevor Zegras (born March 20, 2001) is an American professional ice hockey center for the Anaheim Ducks of the National Hockey League (NHL). He was selected by the Ducks, ninth overall, in the 2019 NHL Entry Draft. Zegras played college hockey at Boston University.

Early life
Zegras was born on March 20, 2001, in Bedford, New York to parents of Greek descent Gary and Julie. He began skating at the age of three and played in the Rising Stars youth program alongside his cousins. Growing up, he was a fan of the New York Rangers but studied and emulated Patrick Kane of the Chicago Blackhawks.

Playing career
Growing up in New York, Zegras played bantam major hockey with the Mid Fairfield Rangers before joining the Avon Old Farms school's Winged Beavers of the Founders League (USHS). During his tenure with the Winged Beavers from 2016 to 2017, Zegras also recorded 18 goals and 24 assists for 42 points. As a sophomore at Avon Old Farms, Zegras attended the USA Hockey National Team Development Program's (USNTDP) Top 40 tryout and qualified for the team.

Zegras joined the USNTDP under 17 team for their 2017–18 season in the United States Hockey League (USHL), where he recorded 20 goals and 39 assists for 59 points. Following this, he joined their U18 team in 2018–19 where he earned 87 points, including 61 assists. As a result of his play in the USHL, Zegras was drafted in the first round, ninth overall, by the Anaheim Ducks at the 2019 NHL Entry Draft. In spite of his draft selection, Zegras kept his commitment to play NCAA Division I ice hockey for Boston University.

Collegiate
Zegras played for the Boston University Terriers men's ice hockey team for the 2019–20 NCAA season. He competed with the Terriers in 33 games where he finished tied for third among Division I freshmen in points with 36. At the conclusion of his freshman season, Zegras was named to the Hockey East Third Team All-Star, selected to Hockey East All-Rookie Team, and named a finalist for Hockey East Rookie of the Year.

Professional
Zegras officially concluded his collegiate career on  March 27, 2020, by signing a three-year entry-level contract with the Ducks. Following the signing, Zegras was re-assigned to their American Hockey League (AHL) affiliate, the San Diego Gulls, to play out the remainder of the 2020–21 season. On February 5, 2021, Zegras made his professional debut with Gulls and had one goal and two assists in a 4–1 win over the Bakersfield Condors. He was eventually recalled to the NHL level in late February and subsequently made his NHL debut against the Arizona Coyotes on February 22. A few games later, on March 18, 2021, Zegras scored his first NHL goal against Adin Hill of the Arizona Coyotes in a 3–2 overtime win. During the same game, fellow rookie Jamie Drysdale also scored, making the teammates the youngest in NHL history to each score their first NHL goals less than 2:30 apart. He finished the season with 13 points through 24 games, with six points coming in his final six regular-season games.

Zegras was eventually returned to the AHL in April to aid in his development and transition to the professional league. When speaking of the re-assignment, executive Vice President and General Manager Bob Murray stated: "He's ahead of our scheduled progression, and as a result, we are moving him to center ice effective immediately. He will need some experience in the AHL first, but our expectation is that he will be back with us in the near future and play center for the Ducks for years to come." Upon returning to the AHL, Zegras made the transition from left wing to center which resulted in an increased offensive output. 

During training camp prior to the 2021–22 season, Zegras continued to play the role of center and was named to their opening night roster. Zegras quickly became a mainstay on the Ducks lineup while playing alongside Sonny Milano and Rickard Rakell. On December 7, 2021, Zegras made a never seen before lacrosse-style assist to Sonny Milano in a game against the Buffalo Sabres. By December, he had scored 22 points through 27 games to rank second amongst league rookies in scoring while also averaging 17:00 in ice time. As a result of his play, Zegras was one of four Ducks players on the NHL All-Star Game fan vote ballot. He was named the NHL Rookie of the Month for December 2021 after recording 11 points in nine games. Although Zegras was not nominated for the 2022 All-Star Game, he was later named a special guest, participating in the Breakaway Challenge. Zegras finished his first full season with 23 goals and 38 assists, and was named a finalist for the Calder Memorial Trophy, awarded to the NHL's rookie of the year; the award went to Moritz Seider. In August 2022, Zegras was named the cover athlete for NHL 23 alongside Sarah Nurse.

International play

On January 5, 2021, Zegras, representing the United States at the 2021 IIHF World Junior Championships won the gold medal over Canada 2–0, and scored 1 goal and recorded 1 assist during the game. He was named World Juniors MVP after scoring 7 goals and recording 11 assists during the tournament, which he also led in scoring. He also tied the Team USA points record held by Jordan Schroeder.

Career statistics

Regular season and playoffs

International

References

External links
 

2001 births
Living people
American people of Greek descent
American men's ice hockey centers
Anaheim Ducks draft picks
Anaheim Ducks players
Boston University Terriers men's ice hockey players
National Hockey League first-round draft picks
People from Bedford, New York
Ice hockey players from New York (state)
San Diego Gulls (AHL) players
USA Hockey National Team Development Program players
Avon Old Farms alumni